In Greek mythology, Podarces was a son of Iphiclus (son of Phylacus, founder of Phylace) by Diomedeia and the brother of Protesilaus. In some accounts, he and his brother were called the sons of Phylacus and Astyoche instead.

Mythology 
In Homer's Iliad, Podarces and Protesilaus were former suitors of Helen, and therefore bound to defend the marriage rights of Menelaus, her husband, when Helen was kidnapped by Paris. After Protesilaus was killed by Hector, Podarces led the Phylacian troops in the Trojan War, on the side of the Greeks.  According to the Posthomerica, by Quintus of Smyrna, he was killed by Penthesilea, the Queen of the Amazons.

Namesake 
Podarces was also the original name of Priam, king of Troy.

Note

References
Gaius Julius Hyginus, Fabulae from The Myths of Hyginus translated and edited by Mary Grant. University of Kansas Publications in Humanistic Studies. Online version at the Topos Text Project.
March, Jennifer R., Cassell's Dictionary of Classical Mythology. Sterling Publishing Company, Inc., 2001, pp. 640–641.

Achaean Leaders
Thessalian characters in Greek mythology